The 2015 UCI Mountain Bike World Cup included two disciplines: Olympic Cross-Country (XCO) and Downhill (DHI).

The overall World Cup titles in cross-country were won by Nino Schurter and Jolanda Neff. The downhill titles were won by Aaron Gwin and Rachel Atherton. The junior men's downhill title was won by Laurie Greenland.

Cross-country

Elite

Downhill

Series Classification

Men's

Women's

See also
2015 UCI Mountain Bike & Trials World Championships

References

External links
 UCI Homepage
 2015 UCI Mountain Bike World Cup Calendar

UCI Mountain Bike World Cup
Mountain Bike World Cup